Francesco da Cotignola (c. 1475–1532), also called Zaganelli, was an Italian painter of the Renaissance period, active mainly in Parma and Ravenna. 

He was a pupil of the painter Niccolo Rondinelli. He painted for Basilica of Sant'Apollinare in Classe near Ravenna, Faenza, and Parma. His brother, Bernardino, was also a painter, but nowhere as successful as what Francesco was able to do. He was likely also family of Girolamo Marchesi da Cotignola.

References

External links

Italian Paintings: North Italian School, a collection catalog containing information about da Cotignola and his works (see pages: 67–68).

1475 births
1532 deaths
15th-century Italian painters
Italian male painters
16th-century Italian painters
Painters from Parma
Italian Renaissance painters